The Peter Claver Building, previously the French Hospital, was a historic building in New Orleans, Louisiana. It occupied the square bounded by Orleans, Derbigny, Ann Street, and Roman Streets, just back from Claiborne Avenue.

History

Hospital 
It was constructed in 1861 by La Société Française de Bienfaisance (French Benevolent and Mutual Aid Society of New Orleans), originally offering health care to the city's Francophone community. It became popularly known as "the French Hospital". The hospital closed in closed on October 31, 1949. The building was subsequently rented out for offices.

It served as national headquarters of the Knights of Peter Claver organization during 1951 to 1974, when a new, adjacent building was constructed to serve as its headquarters instead. 

The building was demolished in 1986.

Architecture 
The original building was constructed in the Greek Revival style in 1861, relatively late for applications of that style. It was further developed around 1883.

Notable figures 

 Lee Harvey Oswald, who assassinated U.S. President John F. Kennedy on November 22, 1963 in Dallas, Texas, was born at the French Hospital on October 18, 1939.

References

Hospital buildings completed in 1861
Historic sites in Louisiana
Buildings and structures in New Orleans
Defunct hospitals in Louisiana
1861 establishments in Louisiana
Buildings and structures demolished in 1986
Knights of Peter Claver & Ladies Auxiliary
African-American Roman Catholicism